Shreya Ghoshal is an Indian singer who has established herself as a leading playback singer of Indian cinema. She is highly regarded as one of the most successful singers of all time, having won six Filmfare Awards, ten Filmfare Awards South and four National Film Awards. She has established herself as one of the leading singers in Bengali, Bhojpuri, Hindi, Kannada,  Malayalam, Marathi, Punjabi, Tamil and Telugu languages.

Studio albums

Songs sung by Shreya Ghoshal

Bengali Discography

Bhojpuri songs

Hindi Discography

Kannada Discography

Malayalam songs

Marathi Discography

Punjabi songs

Tamil Discography

Telugu Discography

Urdu songs

Other languages

Angika songs

Assamese Songs

English songs 
This list includes even the songs in different languages by Ghoshal used in English movies.

French songs

Gujarati songs

Nepali songs

Odia songs

Tulu songs

References 
General

 "Shreya Ghoshal partial discography". Musicindiaonline

Specific

Shreya Ghoshal
Ghoshal